The Players Tour Championship 2013/2014 was a series of snooker tournaments which started on 6 June 2013 and ended on 29 March 2014, with events held across Europe and Asia. In this season the European events formed the European Tour and events held in Asia the Asian Tour. The twelve regular minor-ranking events concluded with the Finals.

Schedule

Order of Merit

European Tour
The calculation method of the European Tour Order of Merit was changed this season. The previously used £1=€1 system was changed to accommodate the increasing prize money of the continental European events. World Snooker decided to use the £1=€1.2 conversation rate.

After 8 out of 8 events:

(Top 25 players out of 515)

Asian Tour 

After 4 out of 4 events:
(Top 9 players out of 202)

Finals

The Finals of the Players Tour Championship 2013/2014 took place between 25–29 March 2014 at the Guild Hall in Preston, England. It was contested by the top 24 players on the European Tour Order of Merit, and the top eight from the Asian Tour Order of Merit. If a player qualified from both Order of Merits, then the highest position counted and the next player on the other list qualified. If a player finished on both lists on the same place, then the European Tour Order of Merit took precedence and the next player from the Asian Tour Order of Merit qualified. The seeding list of the Finals was based on the combined list from the earnings of both Order of Merits.

Notes

References